Chris La Tray (born April 4, 1967) is a writer who lives in Missoula, Montana. He is a member of the Little Shell Tribe of Chippewa Indians and also identifies as Métis. His first full-length book, One-Sentence Journal: Short Poems and Essays From the World At Large won the 2018 Montana Book Award and a 2019 High Plains Book Award. He published Descended From a Travel-worn Satchel, a book of haiku and haibun poetry, in 2021.  His next book, Becoming Little Shell is to be published in Summer 2023.

La Tray grew up in Frenchtown, Montana. His grandparents identified as Chippewa but his father denied the family's Native American ancestry. He was raised with a knowledge of his Métis background, but first became aware that his heritage was also Little Shell in his early 40s, a common experience for people of Little Shell heritage.  His Métis great-great-grandfather worked an interpreter for the US Army, as he knew multiple languages, including French, English, Cree, Chippewa (Ojibwe), Dakota, and Crow (Apsalooke). 

La Tray keeps a bi-weekly Substack newsletter called, "An Irritable Métis."

Prior to publishing full-length books, La Tray published numerous freelance nonfiction and short fiction pieces as well as photography, and was a regular contributing writer for the Missoula Independent.

References

External links
An Irritable Métis newsletter
Poetry at Tiny Seed Journal

Ojibwe people
Métis people
Writers from Montana
1967 births
Living people